(11 January 1359 – 6 June 1393) was the 5th of the Emperors of Northern Court during the period of two courts in Japan. According to pre-Meiji scholars, his reign spanned the years from 1371 through 1382.

This Nanboku-chō "sovereign" was named after the 10th century Emperor En'yū and go- (後), translates literally as "later;" and thus, he may be called the "Later Emperor En'yū", or, in some older sources, may be identified as "Emperor En'yū, the second", or as "Emperor En'yū II."

Genealogy
His personal name was Ohito (緒仁).

He was the second son of the fourth Northern Pretender Emperor Go-Kōgon.  His mother was Fujiwara no Nakako (藤原仲子), Hirohashi Kanetsuna's daughter.

Consort: Sanjō Itsuko (三条 厳子) (also known as Fujiwara no Izuko). Sanjō Kintada's daughter. 
First son: Imperial Prince Motohito (幹仁親王) later Emperor Go-Komatsu
First daughter: Imperial Princess Keiko (1381–1399; 珪子内親王)

Lady-in-waiting Fujiwara no Imako (藤原今子), Shijō Takasato's daughter
Second son: Imperial Prince Priest Dōchō (1378–1446; 道朝法親王)

Naishi: Ogimachi Sanjo Sanetoshi’s daughter

Naishi: Azechi-no-tsubone, Tachibana Tomoshige’s daughter

unknown
 daughter: (d.1391)
 daughter: ??? 
 son: ???

Events of Go-En'yū's life
In his own lifetime, Go-En'yū and those around him believed that he occupied the Chrysanthemum Throne from 9 April 1371 to 24 May 1382.

In 1371, by Imperial Proclamation, he received the rank of shinnō (親王), or Imperial Prince (and potential heir).  Immediately afterwards, he became emperor upon the abdication of his father, Emperor Go-Kōgon.  There was said to be a disagreement between Go-Kōgon and the retired Northern Emperor Emperor Sukō over the Crown Prince.  With the support of Hosokawa Yoriyuki, who controlled the Bakufu, Go-Kōgon's son became the Northern Emperor.

Until 1374, Go-Kōgon ruled as cloistered emperor.  In 1368, Ashikaga Yoshimitsu was named shōgun, and with his guardianship, the Imperial Court was stabilized.  In 1382, upon abdicating to Emperor Go-Komatsu, his cloistered rule began.  Having no actual power, he rebelled, attempting suicide and accusing Ashikaga Yoshimitsu and his consort Itsuko of adultery.

In 1392, peace with the Southern Court being concluded, the Period of the Northern and Southern Courts came to an end.  On 6 June 1393, Go-En'yū died. He is enshrined with other emperors at the imperial tomb called Fukakusa no kita no misasagi (深草北陵) in Fushimi-ku, Kyoto.

Eras of Go-En'yū's reign
The years of Go-En'yū's Nanboku-chō reign are more specifically identified by more than one era name or nengō.

Nanboku-chō Southern court
Eras as reckoned by legitimate Court (as determined by Meiji rescript)
 Kentoku        (1370–1372)
 Benchū  (1372–1375)
 Tenju          (1375–1381)
 Kōwa      (1381–1384)

Nanboku-chō Northern court
Eras as reckoned by pretender Court (as determined by Meiji rescript)
 Ōan         (1368–1375)
 Eiwa            (1375–1379)
 Kōryaku (1379–1381)
 Eitoku          (1381–1384)

Southern Court rivals
Emperor Chōkei

See also
 Emperor of Japan
 List of Emperors of Japan
 Imperial cult

Notes

References

 Ponsonby-Fane, Richard Arthur Brabazon. (1959).  The Imperial House of Japan. Kyoto: Ponsonby Memorial Society. 
 Titsingh, Isaac, ed. (1834). [Siyun-sai Rin-siyo/Hayashi Gahō, 1652], ''Nipon o daï itsi ran; ou,  Annales des empereurs du Japon.''  Paris: Oriental Translation Fund of Great Britain and Ireland.

 
 

Go-En'yu
Go-En'yu, Emperor of Japan
Go-En'yu, Emperor of Japan
Emperor Go-Enyu
Emperor Go-Enyu
Emperor Go-Enyu
14th-century Japanese monarchs
Japanese retired emperors
Japanese rebels